Año Bisiesto (Leap Year) is a 2010 Mexican film from the Australian-Mexican screenwriter and film director Michael Rowe.

Synopsis
Shot almost entirely in a seedy one-room apartment, this psychodrama details the grinding routine of Laura (Mónica del Carmen), a 25-year-old freelance journalist, who lives a very isolated life in her small apartment rarely venturing out besides getting men home from nightclubs and never going beyond one night in bed. Until she meets the quiet, inscrutable Arturo (Gustavo Sánchez Parra) and the pair enter into an intense, violent sexual relationship. The story focuses on the fascinating evolution of their relationship. As days go by, Laura crosses out the days on a calendar, revealing her secret past to her lover. It takes place in February on a leap year.

Production
At first Michael Rowe wanted the violence and sexual relations on screen to be real, but during filming Gustavo Sánchez Parra proposed to solve some things with tricks because "that's what filmmaking is all about, making people believe that we do things for real." So Rowe changed his position and later confirmed that in the end only two scenes were unsimulated.

Main releases

The film premiered in France, at the Cannes Film Festival Directors' Fortnight 17 May 2010, and a month later on a public release. Next place to see the film was Rowe's home country, Australia, at the Melbourne International Film Festival and many other Film Festivals followed (Toronto, Athens, Rio de Janeiro, Sao Paulo, Mar del Plata in Argentine, Hong Kong and the Latin Beat Film Festival in Japan, among others).

According to the producers, the film was sold in over 30 countries and in Mexico it played in commercial theaters with only 12 copies and was seen by close to 50,000 spectators –unlike large productions that screen up to 200 copies.

Film festivals and awards

References

External links 
 
 Film web site

2010 films
2010s erotic drama films
BDSM in films
2010s Spanish-language films
Films shot in Mexico
Mexican erotic drama films
Caméra d'Or winners
2010 drama films
2010s Mexican films